Purcell station is a train station in Purcell, Oklahoma, United States, served by Amtrak's  train. This is the second station in this location to serve Amtrak. The original Atchison, Topeka and Santa Fe Railroad depot was torn down in the 1990s; its last service was the Lone Star, discontinued in 1979. The current brick depot was completed in 2001 with a grant from the Great American Stations Foundation.

References

External links

Heartland Flyer -- Purcell
Purcell Amtrak Station (USA Rail Guide -- Train Web)

Amtrak stations in Oklahoma
Railway stations in the United States opened in 1999
Atchison, Topeka and Santa Fe Railway stations